Dan Gatto (born Dan Merrick Gatto; September 21, 1970) is an American musician best recognized as the vocalist for synth punk band Babyland. He also collaborated with Vampire Rodents composer Daniel Vahnke on a project called Recliner. After Babyland dissolved in 2009, Gatto founded Continues as an outlet for his solo work.

Biography
Dan Merrick Gatto was born on September 21, 1970 and raised in the San Francisco Bay area. He became passionate about music at the age of twelve when he discovered The Human League's Dare album. By fifteen he had begun to compose electronic music and in 1989 formed the synth punk group Babyland with percussionist Michael Smith. They released six full-length albums between 1992 and 2008: You Suck Crap, A Total Letdown, Who's Sorry Now, Outlive Your Enemies, The Finger and Cavecraft.
 In 1992, Gatto met Daniel Vahnke, vocalist and composer for Vampire Rodents, and together they started the project Recliner. They collaborated on three songs together, "Trilobite", "Noise Dive" and Zygote, all of which appear on Vampire Rodents' Lullaby Land and Clockseed albums. In 2009, Michael Smith announced that he had become dissatisfied with the direction Babyland had headed and the duo parted ways in October of that year. Still eager to pursue music, Gatto began composing under the moniker Continues and released a self-titled solo album under the name in 2012.

Discography
Babyland
 You Suck Crap (1992)
 A Total Letdown (1994)
 Who's Sorry Now (1995)
 Outlive Your Enemies (1998)
 The Finger (2004)
 Cavecraft (2008)

Continues
Continues (2012)

Guest appearances
 Vampire Rodents: Lullaby Land (1993)
 Vampire Rodents: Clockseed (1995)
 Philipp Münch: Mondo Obscura (2012)

References

External links

Continues at Bandcamp

American rock singers
American industrial musicians
20th-century American singers
21st-century American singers
1970 births
Living people
20th-century American male singers
21st-century American male singers